This is a list of Widnes Vikings coaches since the 1964 season to present.

Source: rugby.widnes.tv.
Win Percentage is worked out as number of wins, divided by total number of games.
Table currently only lists records from league games.

History
On 16 February 2009 Widnes declared that they had parted company with coach Steve McCormack, through 'mutual consent'. The news came 3 days after Widnes were controversially beaten 22-20 at home to Co-Operative Championship 1 side Oldham in the Northern Rail Cup Stage. Vikings' chairman Steve O'Connor was quick to announce that the decision wasn't made on the back of the Oldham defeat alone. John Stankevitch was appointed as caretaker coach after McCormacks exit from the club.

Paul Cullen was appointed as Head Coach on 8 March 2009, Cullen first aided John Stankevitch in his final game as caretaker coach, beating French side Toulouse Olympique 70-0 in the first game of the 2009 Co-operative Championship.

Cullen had a successful first season with the Vikings, finishing in 4th position in the 2009 Co-operative Championship and winning the 2009 Northern Rail Cup.

References

 
Widnes Vikings